Deux Frères may refer to:
 French ship Deux Frères, an 80-gun ship of the line of the French Navy
 Deux Freres (1798 ship), a tartane that the French Navy requisitioned in 1798, that the Royal Navy captured in 1799, and that was lost that same year in a gale.
 Deux frères (TV series) (fr), a controversial 1999 Québec TV series
 Deux frères (album), an album by French rap duo PNL

See also
 Two Brothers (1929 film), a 1929 German silent film directed by Mikhail Dubson
 Two Brothers (2004 film), a 2004 adventure family film directed by Jean-Jacques Annaud